Scary Stories for Sleep-overs is a series of horror children's books written by R.C. Welch, Q.L. Pearce, and various other authors and illustrated by Ricardo Delgado, Bartt Warbuton, Dwight Been and others throughout the series. The series was enormously popular, publishing millions of copies and ten initial volumes between the years of 1991 and 1999. The series even produced several one-shot novels and a spin-off series, Scary Mysteries for Sleep-overs. Reaching its peak popularity in the mid-1990s, this was Price Stern Sloan's answer to Scary Stories to Tell in the Dark.

Overview 

A handful of stories from the first and fourth books in the series have since been released on audiobook in cassette form. The series spawned a compilation book, The Scary Stories for Sleep-overs Almanac, three individual novels, Scary Stories for Sleep-overs: A Novel, and a spin-off series, Scary Mysteries for Sleep-overs. A boxed set was released containing many of the stories from the series. Taking a cue from Scary Stories to Tell in the Dark, this series was also among the most challenged series of books from 1990 to 1999.

Hallmarks 
Usually released one a year, one selected author would write 11 anthology-style stories per volume. Each illustrator would create at least one dark illustration per story. The series hit its stride in the mid-1990s when author Q.L. Pearce was selected to write the bulk of the series starting with the second volume. The books were soon reprinted with each book clearly labeled with a number. After the release of the 7th volume the books were shortened to 7 or 8 stories per volume and continued to swap authors each year until the series ended in 1999.

Most stories featured young, troubled protagonists who found themselves facing a paranormal situation or antagonist against their better judgment. Most stories would feature a twist ending, leaving the fate of the main character dead, trapped or uncertain. This device was used most often as a moral tool for readers. Most of the suspense came from dark story-telling, which left room for uncertainty from story to story.

Scary Stories for Sleep-overs series (1991–1999)
{| class="wikitable" style="width:100%;"
|-
! style="width:30px; background:#AE1C26; color:#fff;"|# !! style="background:#AE1C26;color:#fff;"|Title !! style="width:160px; background:#AE1C26; color:#fff;"|Author !! style="background:#AE1C26;color:#fff;"|Original published date !! style="background:#AE1C26;color:#fff;"|Pages !! style="width:120px; background:#AE1C26;"|ISBN

|}

Scary Stories for Sleep-overs novels (1996–1997)
{| class="wikitable" style="width:100%;"
|-
! style="width:30px; background:#AE1C26; color:#fff;"|# !! style="background:#AE1C26;color:#fff;"|Title !! style="width:160px; background:#AE1C26; color:#fff;"|Author !! style="background:#AE1C26;color:#fff;"|Original published date !! style="background:#AE1C26;color:#fff;"|Pages !! style="width:120px; background:#AE1C26;"|ISBN

|}

Scary Mysteries for Sleep-overs series (1996–1997)
{| class="wikitable" style="width:100%;"
|-
! style="width:30px; background:#AE1C26; color:#fff;"|# !! style="background:#AE1C26;color:#fff;"|Title !! style="width:160px; background:#AE1C26; color:#fff;"|Author !! style="background:#AE1C26;color:#fff;"|Original published date !! style="background:#AE1C26;color:#fff;"|Pages !! style="width:120px; background:#AE1C26;"|ISBN

|}

See also
 Price Stern Sloan
 Scary Stories to Tell in the Dark
 Tales for the Midnight Hour
 Short & Shivery

References 

Series of children's books
Horror short story collections
1991 short story collections